Giuseppe Quaglio (2 December 1747 – 23 January 1828) was an Italian painter and stage designer, active in scene painting in Mannheim, Frankfurt, and Ludwigsburg.

Born in the town of Laino, between Lake Como and Lake Lugano, Giuseppe is part of the Quaglio family of scene painters, architects, and artists. Giuseppe's sons include the scene designer Simon (1795–1878), active mainly in Munich, Angelo Quaglio the Elder (1784—1815), an architect and painter. He designed and painted landscapes and architectural pictures for Boisserée's work on Cologne Cathedral, Domenico (1787–1837), a landscape and architectural painter, scene painter, engraver, and architect, born in Munich and died at Hohenschwangau; and Lorenzo (1793–1869), a genre painter and lithographer.

References

James Anderson, The Complete Dictionary of Opera and Operetta.

1747 births
1828 deaths
German scenic designers
Opera designers
18th-century Italian painters
Italian male painters
19th-century Italian painters
Italian scenic designers
Painters from Lombardy
19th-century Italian male artists
18th-century Italian male artists